Hugo Becker (born Jean Otto Eric Hugo Becker, 13 February 1863, died 30 July 1941) was a prominent German cellist, cello teacher, and composer. He studied at a young age with Alfredo Piatti, and later Friedrich Grützmacher in Dresden.

Biography
He was born in 1863 in Strasbourg; his father Jean Becker was a famous violinist. His father tried teaching him violin at the age of six, but the young Becker loved cello, and switched over at the age of nine. By age fifteen he was touring with a string quartet made up of him, his father, sister, and brother. He had also become a leading cellist in the court orchestra in Mannheim.

In 1884, Becker was appointed solo cellist with the Frankfurt Opera Orchestra, and the following year became the leading cello teacher at the Frankfurt Hoch Conservatory. From 1909 to 1929, he was professor of cello at the Hochschule für Musik in Berlin; among his students was George Georgescu, who would replace him as cellist in the Marteau Quartet before forsaking the cello for the conductor's podium on account of a hand injury.  Later, Georgescu would remark, "All I know, I learned from Hugo Becker."

During this time Becker also toured extensively and played chamber music with Eugène Ysaÿe and Ferruccio Busoni in a piano trio., and later with Artur Schnabel and Carl Flesch as the third Schnabel Trio between 1914 and 1921.

He died on 30 July 1941.

Legacy
He owned two Stradivarius cellos: the 1700 Cristiani and another one built in 1719 now known as the Becker.

Selected works
Andante religioso 
Three Pieces for Cello with Piano Accompaniment
Scènes d'amour, duo 
Deux Morceaux: Romance, Duo 
Deux Morceaux: Valse gracieuse, Duo 
Cello Concerto, Op.10 in A major (published by Schott in parts in 1902, piano/cello version ca.1896, in score in 1904)
Aus dem Leben des Waldschrat, suite 
Mechanik und Ästhetik des Violoncellospiels

Sources
Allmusic
Sadie, S. (ed.) (1980) The New Grove Dictionary of Music & Musicians, [vol. # 2].

References

1863 births
1941 deaths
Musicians from Strasbourg
German classical cellists
German music educators
German Romantic composers
Alsatian-German people
People from Alsace-Lorraine
German male classical composers
20th-century German male musicians
19th-century German male musicians
20th-century cellists